Ceiba ventricosa, known as the barriguda tree, is a species of tree in the Malvaceae family. It is a tropical and evergreen species native to the Atlantic rainforests of Brazil. It can reach a height of 26 meters, and the bole can grow to a diameter of 60 centimeters. The species was described by Pedro Felix Ravenna in 1998.

Uses
The timber is harvested, but is of low quality. The wood is used by the Aimoré people of Brazil as a wooden plug or disk which is worn in the lower lip and the lobe of the ear.

References

ventricosa
Flora of Brazil
Plants described in 1998